The Christian College Consortium is an affiliation of 13 Christian colleges and universities in the United States. Member schools provide each other with mutual support through scholarships, conferences, and exchange programs.

History 
The Consortium was founded in 1971 with an original membership of ten evangelical colleges. In 1976, it established a sister organization, the Christian College Coalition (now called the Council for Christian Colleges and Universities) for the purpose of representing the interests of Christian colleges to policymakers in Washington, D.C. The two organizations shared facilities in Washington until 1982, when the Consortium relocated its headquarters to St. Paul, Minnesota. The offices of the Consortium have subsequently moved to Wenham, Massachusetts.

Member schools
The Consortium includes 13 member institutions:
Asbury University
Bethel University
George Fox University
Gordon College
Greenville College
Houghton College
Malone University
Messiah University
Seattle Pacific University
Taylor University
Trinity International University
Westmont College
Wheaton College

Consortium activities
The consortium facilitates access by consortium students to academic programs and offerings of the other consortium schools through its student visitor program, which allows study for at least one semester at any of the other consortium schools, including many of their external programs, with no separate application process.

Reference list

External links
Official website

College and university associations and consortia in the United States
Organizations established in 1971
1971 establishments in the United States